Anglia Square is a shopping centre in the north of Norwich city centre, in Norfolk, England. Opened in 1970, it was part of a larger Norwich redevelopment during this period, which was also complemented by the establishment of the nearby HMSO building, Sovereign House, which opened in 1969. The square took six years to build, but was never actually finished.

Pedestrian shop-lined walkways lead onto Anglia Square which was originally open to the elements but is now partially covered by a steel and glass structure – added in the late 20th century. The red brick and concrete buildings are finished in the brutalist style. Forming the western boundary of the centre is the former HMSO building, Sovereign House. The building now stands empty and due for demolition.

In 2014, the centre was bought by investment manager Threadneedle Investments for £7.5 million. In early 2018, Weston Homes and landowner Columbia Threadneedle submitted regeneration plans for the site, which included a controversial 25-storey tower block, but due to intervention, subsequent plans reduced the height to 20-storey. The updated plans were rejected in 2020 by the secretary of state, Robert Jenrick. Subsequently, in April 2021, the developer announced it would work on new proposals for the site.

History

Stump Cross and Botolph Street 
The area where Anglia Square stands today was part of the Saxon settlement of Northwic, which was defended by Anglo-Scandinavian defensive ditches running along what is now Botolph Street and Anglia Square car park. Magdalen Street and St Augustine's, which are two of the oldest streets in Norwich, date back to those times. During the 19th century, a Crape Manufactory – a factory which produced a fabric often worn when mourning, was built where Anglia Square now stands. The area was badly bombed during the Baedeker raids in April 1942, during World War II and the area was deemed suitable for post-war development.

Redevelopment 
The 1945 Norwich Plan, prepared for the city council by C.H. James, Rowland Pierce and Norwich City Engineer H.C. Rowlet, envisioned an urban dual carriageway encircling the city centre, creating ambitiously titled “gates” (aka roundabouts) at every major intersection. Although it was unrealised in its entirety, the western and part of the northern sides of this ring road became the Inner Link Road, constructed between 1968 and 1975.

Many historic buildings were cleared in the making of Anglia Square and the subsequent inner-ring road. One of the oldest was the Kings Arms public house on Botolph Street, which on its gable end in large iron characters were the letters "I" and "C" and the date "1646", now preserved in one of the Norwich museums. Also demolished was the Regency bank at the junction of Magdalen Street and Botoph Street. Some other Georgian and Victorian buildings along St George's Street that survived the war bombings as well as gabled and jettied Tudor buildings. The cleared areas near where The Shuttles pub stood, were never built on, and remains an empty wasteland today.

The centre was designed by Alan Cooke & Partners who handled the whole development.

Facilities

Shops 
The single storey shops include discount supermarkets and a wide range of privately owned and high street stores. The covered square features a selection of street stalls.

Cinema 
Built on a concrete raft and rising above the centre is the former Odeon cinema which opened on 8 July 1971, then part of the Hollywood chain, which replaced a nearby 2,000 seat pre-war cinema, then in 2019 closing permanently.  In July, 2013 the cinema hosted the world premiere of Alan Partridge: Alpha Papa.

Regeneration 

Anglia Square and the surrounding area is to be the centre of a major redevelopment with a suggested name of Calvert Square (Calvert Street is nearby). During 2008 the public were invited to view the proposals. Work was due to start in 2009 but plans were scaled down due to the credit crunch. In January 2011 new plans for the square were lodged and the developers hope to gain approval before the end of April 2011. In November, 2009 the public were asked to have their say on the proposed development. The multimillion-pound plans are to be part of the Northern City Centre Area Action Plan.

In 2014, the centre was bought by investment manager Threadneedle Investments for £7.5 million.

The current owners and their partner Weston Homes announced in November 2016, they have been holding talks with chief officers at Norwich City Hall. Plans submitted include the demolition of Anglia Square, the former stationery office and Gildengate House. More than 1000 homes are planned to be built above shop units and a new public square.

In early 2018, Weston Homes and landowner Columbia Threadneedle submitted regeneration plans for the site. These include 1200 homes, of which 120 will be affordable, a major supermarket, hotel, green squares and central courtyards, along with a 20-storey tower. The project is opposed by Historic England, civic watchdog the Norwich Society and the Dean and Chapter of Norwich Cathedral.

References

Gallery

External links 

 £271 million revamp approved by Norwich City Council

Buildings and structures in Norwich
Shopping centres in Norfolk
1970 establishments in England
Brutalist architecture in England
Concrete buildings and structures